Thomas Talbot Waterman (23 April 1885 – 6 January 1936) was an American anthropologist.

Early life 
Waterman was born in Hamilton, Missouri, and raised in Fresno, California.

Education 
Waterman matriculated University of California, Berkeley in Hebrew, later at Columbia University, New York completed a Ph.D. in Anthropology.

Career 
Waterman brought Ishi, from Oroville, California, to the Affiliated Colleges Museum.

Personal life
Waterman married Grace Godwin in 1910, later, Ruth Dulaney in 1927, fathering Helen Maria and Thomas Talbot Jr.

Partial list of works 
 
The Yana Indians (1908)
  Religious Practices of the Diegueño Indians (1910)
The phonetic elements of the Northern Paiute language (Berkeley: University Press, 1911)

 
  (2012).
Yurok Geography (University of California Publications in American Archaeology and Ethnology; Berkeley, Calif.: University of California Press, 1920)
Source book in anthropology, (1920, with A. L. Kroeber)
 Waterman, T.T., 1922. The Geographical Names Used by the Indians of the Pacific Coast. American Geographical Society 12(2):175–194
 Native Houses of Western North America

References

External links

 http://worldcat.org/identities/lccn-n85312111
 https://viaf.org/viaf/12682870/

American anthropologists
American ethnologists
American folklorists
Linguists from the United States
University of California, Berkeley College of Letters and Science faculty
Historians of Native Americans
Linguists of indigenous languages of North America